Koumbia is a village in southwestern Burkina Faso in the Fara Department of Balé Province (Boucle du Mouhoun Region). The nearest larger town is Fara. In 1996 the village had a total population of 823.

This village should not be confused with the much larger town of Koumbia, the capital of Koumbia Department in the province of Tuy (Hauts-Bassins Region).

References

Populated places in the Boucle du Mouhoun Region